Tertiary education, also referred to as third-level, third-stage or post-secondary education, is the educational level following the completion of secondary education. The World Bank, for example, defines tertiary education as including universities as well as trade schools and colleges. Higher education is taken to include undergraduate and postgraduate education, while vocational education beyond secondary education is known as further education in the United Kingdom, or included under the category of continuing education in the United States.

Tertiary education generally culminates in the receipt of certificates, diplomas, or academic degrees.

UNESCO stated that tertiary education focuses on learning endeavors in specialized fields. It includes academic and higher vocational education. 

The World Bank's 2019 World Development Report on the future of work argues that given the future of work and the increasing role of technology in value chains, tertiary education becomes even more relevant for workers to compete in the labor market.

Global progress 

Tertiary education systems will keep expanding over the next 10 years. Globally, the gross enrollment ratio in tertiary education increased from 19% in 2000 to 38% in 2017, with the female enrollment ratio exceeding the male ratio by 4 percentage points.

The tertiary gross enrollment ratio ranges from 9% in low-income countries to 77% in high-income countries, where, after rapid growth in the 2000s, reached a plateau in the 2010s.

Between now and 2030, the biggest increase in tertiary enrollment ratios is expected in middle-income countries, where it will reach 52%. Sustainable Development Goal 4 (SDG 4) commits countries to providing lifelong learning opportunities for all, including tertiary education.

This commitment is monitored through the global indicator for target 4.3 in the sustainable development goal 4 (SDG 4), which measures the participation rate of youth and adults in formal and non-formal education and training in the previous 12 months, whether for work or non-work purposes.

Criticism
In 1994 the UNESCO Salamanca Statement called on the international community to endorse the approach of inclusive education, including at the tertiary level. Since this time the world has witnessed the global massification of tertiary education, yet this explosion of facilities and enrollment has largely entrenched and exacerbated the exclusion of people with disabilities. This is particularly the case in low- and middle-income contexts, where university completion rates for students with disabilities are much lower compared to completion rates of students without disabilities. 

Some tertiary schools have been criticized as having permitted or actively encouraged grade inflation. In addition, certain scholars contend that the supply of graduates in some fields of study is exceeding the demand for their skills, aggravating graduate unemployment, underemployment and credentialism.

Influence on views
Graduates of tertiary education are likely to have different worldviews and moral values than non-graduates. Research indicates that graduates are more likely to have libertarian principles with less adherence to social hierarchies. Graduates are also more likely to embrace cultural and ethnic diversity and express more positive views towards minority groups. For international relationships, graduates are more likely to favor openness, supporting policies like free trade, open borders, the European Union, and more liberal policies regarding international migration.

In the United Kingdom 
Under devolution in the United Kingdom, education is administered separately in England, Wales, Northern Ireland, and Scotland. In England, the term "tertiary education" aligns with the global term "higher education" (i.e. post-18 study). In 2018 the Welsh Government adopted the term "tertiary education" to refer to post-16 education and training in Wales. Since the 1970s, however, specialized further education colleges in England and Wales have called themselves "tertiary colleges" although being part of the secondary education process. These institutions cater for both school leavers and adults, thus combining the main functions of an FE college and a sixth form college. Generally, district councils with such colleges have adopted a tertiary system or structure where a single local institution provides all the 16–19 and adult education, and where schools do not universally offer sixth forms (i.e. schools only serve ages 11–16). However the Further and Higher Education Act 1992 has effectively prevented the creation of new tertiary colleges.

In Australia 

Within Australia "tertiary education" refers to continuing studies after a student's completes secondary school. Tertiary-education options include university, technical and further education or private universities.

In the United States of America 

The higher education system in the United States is decentralized and regulated independently by each state with accreditors playing a key role in ensuring institutions meet minimum standards. It is large and diverse with institutions that are privately governed and institutions that are owned and operated by state and local governments. Some private institutions are affiliated with religious organizations whereas others are secular with enrollment ranging from a few dozen to tens of thousands of students. In short, there are a wide variety of options which are often locally determined. The United States Department of Education presents a broad-spectrum view of tertiary education and detailed information on the nation's educational structure, accreditation procedures, and connections to state as well as federal agencies and entities.

The Carnegie Classification of Institutions of Higher Education provides one framework for classifying U.S. colleges and universities in several different ways. US tertiary education also includes various non-profit organizations promoting professional development of individuals in the field of higher education and helping expand awareness of related issues like international student services and complete campus internationalization.

In the European Union 
Although tertiary education in the EU includes university, it can differ from country to country.

In France 
After going to nursery school (French: école maternelle), elementary school (French: école élémentaire), middle school (French: collège), and high school (French: lycée), a student may go to university, but may also stop at that point.

In Africa

In Nigeria 

Tertiary education refers to post-secondary education received at universities (government or privately funded), monotechnics, polytechnics and colleges of education. After completing a secondary education, students may enroll in a tertiary institution or acquire a vocational education. Students are required to sit for the Joint Admissions and Matriculation Board Entrance Examination (JAMB) as well as the Secondary School Certificate Examination (SSCE) or General Certificate Examination (GCE) and meet varying cut-off marks to gain admission into a tertiary institution.

In Japan
4th and 5th grades of colleges of technology and special training colleges fall into the category.

Colleges of technology are provided by the 1st article of the educational law in Japan as well as universities and junior colleges, which are very often called as high education for two years, but special training colleges are provided by the 124th article of the law as a category of special training schools. Both are regular educational organisations but special training colleges are not "schools" under the law. They are additionally not in high education.

Pupil who finish a junior high school can enter a college of technology but 1st, 2nd and 3rd grades are in secondary education and out of this article. College of technology is special educational system which secondary and tertiary educations intermingle. Graduates from the school are equivalent to graduates from a junior college.

Whilst special training colleges are not "schools" by the law, they are schools in public view. Their most courses are for two years but some have one, three or four-year courses. Graduates from courses for more than two years are equivalent to graduates from junior colleges and graduates from a course for four years can enter a graduate course of a university in recent years.

History of the special training schools
Special training schools were included in miscellaneous schools by the current educational law when it was enforced in 1947. The 83rd article of the law provided for them and they were certainly miscellaneous.

Because miscellaneous schools included educational organisations with lessons for a few times in a week then, some educational organisations including later special training schools were dissatisfied about the system. In addition, there were many problems because of being miscellaneous.

Some educational organisations authorised by some definite condition became miscellaneous schools with reform of the law on 1 January 1957 but were still in the miscellaneous system. The law has not applied to many other educational organisations since the reform.

There were various styles whilst the law authorised: for example, schools to provide about educational backgrounds and those without any provisions about them. There are still many problems and special training schools were created in January 1976. They include three courses: post-secondary, upper-secondary, and general courses. Schools with the post-secondary course for graduates who finish senior high schools and people with equivalent educational backgrounds are called as special training colleges. The upper-secondary course is that for graduates from junior high schools and everyone can enter the general course. The latter is near current miscellaneous schools.

Graduates from special training colleges since 1994 can get diploma. The law does not provide about diploma unlike foundation degree that graduates from colleges of technology can get but is public degree as well.

See also 

 List of countries by tertiary education attainment
 Education by country
 List of universities and colleges by country
 Student SPILL

References

Sources

External links 
 Tertiary education statistics, UNESCO
 Quality Research International - (Glossary)

 
Educational stages

id:Pendidikan tinggi